Senator Houston may refer to:

Andrew Jackson Houston (1854–1941), U.S. Senator from Texas in 1941
George S. Houston (1811–1879), U.S. Senator from Alabama in 1879
Sam Houston (1793–1863), U.S. Senator from Texas from 1846 to 1859
Temple Lea Houston (1860–1905), Texas State Senate

See also
Senator Huston (disambiguation)